Běrunice is a municipality and village in Nymburk District in the Central Bohemian Region of the Czech Republic. It has about 800 inhabitants.

Administrative parts
Villages of Běruničky, Slibovice, Velké Výkleky and Vlkov nad Lesy are administrative parts of Běrunice.

Geography
Most of the municipal territory lies in a flat agricultural landscape in the Central Elbe Table. The Štítarský Stream flows through the municipality.

History
The first written mention of Běrunice is from 1354. The nearby villages of Běruničky and Nový were historically administered by Běrunice, but Nový was attached to Městec Králové in 1950. In 1965, the municipalities of Slibovice, Velké Výkleky, Vlkov nad Lesy and Kněžičky were merged with Běrunice,  but Kněžičky became independent again in 1990.

Sights
The landmark of Běrunice is the Church of the Nativity of the Virgin Mary. It is a simple Baroque church from 1718, which replaced a demolished medieval church from the 14th century.

Notable people
František Janda (1886–1956), architect and urban planner

References

External links

Villages in Nymburk District